Sublimity is a city in Marion County, Oregon,  United States.  The population was 2,967 at the 2020 census. It is part of the Salem Metropolitan Statistical Area.

Geography

Demographics

2010 census
As of the census of 2010, there were 2,681 people, 1,063 households, and 678 families living in the city. The racial makeup of the city was 95.8% White, 0.2% African American, 0.5% Native American, 0.4% Asian, 1.0% from other races, and 2.0% from two or more races. Hispanic or Latino of any race were 3.1% of the population.

There were 1,063 households, of which 27.5% had children under the age of 18 living with them, 53.9% were married couples living together, 7.2% had a female householder with no husband present, 2.6% had a male householder with no wife present, and 36.2% were non-families. 33.2% of all households were made up of individuals, and 24.4% had someone living alone who was 65 years of age or older. The average household size was 2.33 and the average family size was 2.97.

The median age in the city was 47.6 years. 21.6% of residents were under the age of 18; 5.6% were between the ages of 18 and 24; 18.8% were from 25 to 44; 24.9% were from 45 to 64; and 29% were 65 years of age or older. The gender makeup of the city was 47.1% male and 52.9% female.

2000 census
As of the United States 2000 Census, there were 2,148 people, 686 households, and 509 families living in the city.  The population density was 2,259.7 people per square mile (873.0/km).  There were 711 housing units at an average density of 748.0 per square mile (289.0/km).  The racial makeup of the city was 97.44% White, 0.09% African American, 0.47% Native American, 0.28% Asian, 0.23% Pacific Islander, 0.23% from other races, and 1.26% from two or more races. Hispanic or Latino of any race were 1.63% of the population.

There were 686 households, out of which 36.2% had children under the age of 18 living with them, 65.6% were married couples living together, 6.6% had a female householder with no husband present, and 25.7% were non-families. 22.0% of all households were made up of individuals, and 13.7% had someone living alone who was 65 years of age or older.  The average household size was 2.67 and the average family size was 3.14.

In the city, the population was spread out, with 24.3% under the age of 18, 5.4% from 18 to 24, 22.2% from 25 to 44, 18.7% from 45 to 64, and 29.3% who were 65 years of age or older.  The median age was 43 years. For every 100 females, there were 81.7 males.  For every 100 females age 18 and over, there were 75.5 males.

The median income for a household in the city was $49,034, and the median income for a family was $55,921. Males had a median income of $42,734 versus $25,924 for females. The per capita income for the city was $18,646.  About 4.9% of families and 7.5% of the population were below the poverty line, including 7.8% of those under age 18 and 8.9% of those age 65 or over.

Historic buildings
Historic buildings in Sublimity include:
 St. Boniface Church

References

External links
 City of Sublimity (official website)
 Entry for Sublimity in the Oregon Blue Book

Cities in Oregon
Cities in Marion County, Oregon
Salem, Oregon metropolitan area
1903 establishments in Oregon
Populated places established in 1903